Thomas Ward, also known as Tom Ward, is an Australian actor, writer and comedian best known for his role in the award-winning television comedy-drama series Please Like Me, many episodes of which he co-wrote.

Career
Ward co-wrote many episodes of the four series of Please Like Me, along with creator Josh Thomas, which aired on ABC2 between 2013 and 2018 and was nominated for and won numerous awards. He also played the part of Josh's housemate Tom in the series.

In 2015 he played the lead role in Matt Vesely's short film My best friend's stuck on the ceiling, produced by Sophie Hyde and selected for inclusion in the 2015 Adelaide Film Festival, 2016 Palm Springs International ShortFest, 2016 Sydney Film Festival (where it was a Dendy Awards finalist) and the 2016 Melbourne Film Festival. The film became publicly available on YouTube after it was selected by the "Short of the Week" channel on 11 May 2020.

In 2018 Ward co-created a pilot for New Zealand TV channel Three, called Golden Boy. It was first selected to be produced as part of the Three network's "Comedy Pilot Week", after which it was commissioned as a full 8-part comedy series. The series premiered on Three in 2019, attracting positive reviews.

In 2019 he wrote the six-part comedy-drama series Diary of an Uber Driver for ABC TV, which starred Sam Cotton.

References

External links

Australian male actors
Australian male comedians
Australian television writers
Living people
Australian male television writers
Year of birth missing (living people)